Quảng Phú is a township and capital of Cư M'gar District, Đắk Lắk Province, Vietnam.

References

Populated places in Đắk Lắk province
District capitals in Vietnam
Townships in Vietnam